Parker's Cove may refer to:

 Parker's Cove, Newfoundland and Labrador, Canada
 Parker's Cove, Nova Scotia, Canada